Benjamin Gleason (born March 25, 1998) is an American professional ice hockey defenseman who is currently playing for the Texas Stars of the American Hockey League as a prospect to the Dallas Stars of the National Hockey League (NHL).

Playing career

Major junior
Gleason was drafted in the second round, 36th overall, by the London Knights in the 2014 Ontario Hockey League (OHL) Draft. In August 2015, Gleason was one of 11 OHL players selected for the USA Hockey All-American Prospects Game, a game compiled of the top U.S. NHL draft eligible players. However, on October 7, 2015, Gleason was traded to the Hamilton Bulldogs in exchange for a second round pick in the 2017 OHL Selection and a conditional 15th round pick in 2019. Despite his successful season, with 33 points in 66 games, Gleason was passed over in the 2016 NHL Entry Draft.

As an overage player during the 2017–18 season, Gleason helped lead the Bulldogs to their first Leyden Trophy as the regular season champion of the East division in the OHL.

Professional
Undrafted in the NHL Entry Draft, Gleason signed a three-year entry-level contract with the Dallas Stars on September 13, 2018. After attending the Stars' training camp, he was assigned to the Texas Stars of the American Hockey League (AHL). Gleason was recalled to the NHL on November 10, where he recorded his first NHL point on an assist of Denis Guryanov's first NHL goal that night as the Stars lost the game in overtime to the Nashville Predators. On November 22, he was reassigned to the Texas Stars.

Personal life
Gleason comes from a hockey playing family. He is the cousin of former NHL player Tim Gleason and Central Michigan University player James Gleason. His other cousin Jacob played with the Metro Jets in the United States Premier Hockey League.

Career statistics

Regular season and playoffs

International

References

External links
 

1998 births
Living people
American men's ice hockey defensemen
Dallas Stars players
Hamilton Bulldogs (OHL) players
Ice hockey players from Michigan
London Knights players
Sportspeople from Oakland County, Michigan
Texas Stars players
Undrafted National Hockey League players